McKinley at Home, Canton, Ohio aka William McKinley at Canton, Ohio is a silent film  reenactment of William McKinley receiving the Republican nomination for President of the United States in September 1896. The actual nomination had been  several weeks earlier. McKinley is shown emerging from his house to receive the news from his secretary George Cortelyou. His  wife Ida can be seen in a rocking chair on the porch. McKinley is seen removing his hat and wiping his forehead with a handkerchief after receiving the news. It was filmed by a two man crew for American Mutoscope and Biograph Company on 68 mm film, 60.02 m in length. McKinley's brother Abner and  former US president Benjamin Harrison were stockholders in the film company.

See also
Execution of Czolgosz with Panorama of Auburn Prison
American Mutoscope and Biograph Company
Silent films
William McKinley
Ida Saxton McKinley
George Cortelyou

External links
 
 McKinley at Home, Canton, Ohio on YouTube

1896 films
1890s American films
American silent short films
American black-and-white films
Canton, Ohio
William McKinley
Articles containing video clips
American films based on actual events
Films set in 1896
Films set in Ohio
Films shot in Ohio
1896 short films
Films about presidents of the United States